The men's 200m individual medley SM5 event at the 2008 Summer Paralympics took place at the Beijing National Aquatics Center on 11 September. There were two heats; the swimmers with the eight fastest times advanced to the final (although apparently there were only eight entrants so no-one was eliminated).

Results

Heats
Competed from 09:39.

Heat 1

Heat 2

Final
Competed at 17:24.

 
Q = qualified for final. WR = World Record. PR = Paralympic Record.

References
 
 

Swimming at the 2008 Summer Paralympics